Lecithocera alcestis is a moth in the family Lecithoceridae. It was described by Edward Meyrick in 1923. It is found in southern India.

The wingspan is 13–16 mm. The forewings are light fuscous with a cloudy ochreous-whitish dot on the costa at four-fifths. The hindwings are grey, paler anteriorly.

References

Moths described in 1923
alcestis